The Society of Graphic Art (renamed Society of Graphic Fine Art in 1986) is a British arts organisation established in 1919.

History
The Society of Graphic Art (SGA) was founded in 1919 by Frank Lewis Emanuel, whose idea it was, in collaboration with Frank Brangwyn, RA. "They met one evening at Mr. Emanuel's house to discuss the idea, and a Provisional Committee to promote the scheme was the result. To all intents and purposes the Society of Graphic Art was born there and then..." Brangwyn was appointed President, and Emanuel Honorary Secretary.

The Society was formed: 
for the purpose of holding periodical exhibitions of all the various forms of black and white art in a comprehensive and dignified manner. Its aim will be to firther the interests of British and Colonial artists who produce, in monochrome, examples of sound draughtsmanship in pencil, pen-and-ink, monotype, silver-point, dry-point, and in the various methods of engraving on metal, wood, stone, etc. The scope and scale of the scheme is purposely large, as it is desired to form, for the first time in this country, a powerful and thoroughly comprehensive body representing what has truly been described as the most potent and varied side of British art.

According to a respected art journal in 1921 "The foundation of a body to protect the existence of draughtsmanship was never more needed than at the present time." The editorial welcomed the formation of the SGA, as part of "a renascent school of thought", and praised the inaugural exhibition, held at the RBA Galleries in Suffolk Street, London on 1–29 January, 1921. By international standards the SGA was a late starter: the Canadian Society of Graphic Art was formed in 1904, and the Society of American Graphic Artists in 1915.

Over the years the "black and white" Society adopted the use of colour and broadened the range of techniques employed by its artists. The name changed to Society of Graphic Fine Art in 1986.

Some of the artists who exhibited with the SGA in 1921

In the catalogue of the SGA’s first exhibition the names of artists were usually shown with one given name and initial(s); here, they are shown in full.

§ Member of Council.

ǂ Honorary Member.

References

External links 
Official website

Graphic design
British artist groups and collectives
1919 establishments in the United Kingdom